The 1997 FIA GT Zeltweg 4 Hours was the sixth race of the 1997 FIA GT Championship season.  It was run at the redesigned A1-Ring, Austria on August 3, 1997.

Official results
Class winners in bold.  Cars failing to complete 75% of winner's distance marked as Not Classified (NC).

Statistics
 Pole Position – #10 AMG-Mercedes – 1:22.990
 Fastest Lap – #12 AMG-Mercedes – 1:24.601
 Distance – 695.300 km
 Average Speed – 173.150 km/h

External links
 World Sports Prototype Racing – Race Results

Z
Zeltweg 4 Hours